Exploitation may refer to:

Exploitation of natural resources
Exploitation of labour
Forced labour
Exploitation colonialism
Slavery
Sexual slavery and other forms 
Oppression
Psychological manipulation

In arts and entertainment
Exploitation fiction
Exploitation film

As a proper name
Exploitation (film), a 2012 film

See also
 
 Exploit (disambiguation)
 Overexploitation